Nephele comma is a moth of the family Sphingidae. It is very common throughout the Ethiopian Region, including Madagascar.

Food plants
The larvae feed on the leaves of Carissa species.

References

Nephele (moth)
Moths described in 1857
Moths of Africa
Moths of Madagascar